Berthe Qvistgaard (11 August 1910 – 24 October 1999) was a Danish stage and film actress, and winner of the prestigious Tagea Brandt Rejselegat award in 1965.

She was a rector of the Danish National School of Theatre and Contemporary Dance for a period of her life.

She died from Alzheimer's disease which she suffered from throughout the 1990s.

Selected filmography
I dag begynder livet (1939)
Familien Olsen (1940)
Pas på svinget i Solby (1940)
Tror du jeg er født i går! (1941)
Besættelse (1944)
My Son Peter (1953) 
Faith, Hope and Witchcraft (1960) 
Flemming og Kvik (1960)
Det stod i avisen (1962) 
Johnny Larsen (1979)
The Dark Side of the Moon (1986)

References

External links

Danish stage actresses
Danish film actresses
Actresses from Copenhagen
1910 births
1999 deaths
20th-century Danish actresses